F.lli Pinfari S.r.l was an Italian amusement ride manufacturing company based in Suzzara, Italy. Pinfari was liquidated on 15 July 2004, due to the early 2000s recession and the weakness of the United States dollar. In 2007, its brand and intellectual property were acquired by Interpark Amusements Srl, based in Modena.

History
The company, commonly known as Pinfari, was established in 1926 building Dodgem cars and buildings. Its first roller coaster was a wild mouse-style ride in 1954 called "bob-slide". In 1965 the company introduced a small portable coaster called Zyklon. These coasters proved very popular with traveling fairs and carnivals as wells as permanent amusement parks. Pinfari manufactured Zyklons in several variations and sizes, building over 200 since the ride's introduction. In the 1980s Pinfari added loops to the Zyklon model and marketed them as a Looping Zyklon or Looping Star. The model designation added the letter "L" sometimes next to the Z and sometimes after (i.e. ZL42, ZL50 or Z47L). The company also manufactured a popular children's coaster called Big Apple, nearly identical in design to Wacky Worms and Brucomela coasters by Preston and Fabbri.

In the late 1990s Pinfari introduced a new model to eventually replace the Zyklon, although the Zyklon was still offered in the ride catalog. Known simply as Roller Coaster or Thriller Roller Coaster, these models were designated RC48, RC50 or RC70, with the larger RC70 having two loops and a corkscrew. The company also introduced a large non-looping family coaster designated FC80. The first RC70 was installed at M&D's Theme Park in Scotland. The first and only FC80 was built at Wiener Prater in Austria.

Pinfari continued to expand its product line offering a junior inverted coaster in 1999 and a suspended looping coaster, with the first two suspended looping models going to Nigloland in France and Moreno's Park, a traveling show in Brazil.

List of roller coasters

As of 2019, Pinfari has built 186 roller coasters around the world.

References

circa 1997 F.LLI Pinfari ride catalog

External links

Roller coaster manufacturers
Defunct manufacturing companies of Italy
Design companies established in 1926
Manufacturing companies established in 1926
Manufacturing companies disestablished in 2004
1926 establishments in Italy
2004 disestablishments in Italy